Lydia Ruth Elizabeth Kandou or better known as Lydia Kandou (born in Jakarta, Indonesia on February 21, 1963) is an Indonesian actress and model of mixed Dutch with Filipino and Indian and Minahasan descent.

Biography
Kandou was born in Jakarta on 21 February 1963. She is of mixed Manado and Dutch descent.

Kandou first found work as a model. When 16 years old, she was invited to act by director Imam Tantowi. She made her feature film debut in Has Manan's Wanita Segala Zaman. During the next five years she acted in over 20 films, including several directed by Nyak Abbas Akup. These included a role as the singer Chrisye's love interest in Syamsul Fuad's Seindah Rembulan and several films with the comedy troupe Warkop.

Kandou was nominated for her first Citra Award for Best Leading Actress at the 1984 Indonesian Film Festival. She continued acting at a slower rate; between 1985 and 1990 she performed in 10 films. From these roles, she received two further Citra Award nominations.

In 1986, Kandou, a Protestant, married Muslim singer-cum-actor Jamal Mirdad in a civil service. At the time their interfaith marriage was considered "sensational" by the news media and led to extensive debate over the legality of such weddings. Ultimately, civil marriages were banned in Indonesia. Owing to their different religions, this wedding was not recognized by the government until 1995, and the case remained common in legal discussions until the 2000s.

In 1990, Kandou was cast in the lead role of Nyak Abbas Akup's film Boneka dari Indiana (Doll from Indiana). After receiving another nomination for the Citra Award she was reportedly nervous; ultimately she received the award, her first win. Her other films that year were all Warkop comedies. She performed in Ramadhan dan Ramona the following year, which led to another win; her husband, who played the leading man, took Best Leading Actor.

As the Indonesian film industry saw a downturn in the early 1990s Kandou migrated to television. Beginning in 1993, she was a regular on Gara-Gara; in 1997 she left the show to join Selendang Sutra Biru. She acted in the hit television series Pernikahan Dini in 2001, playing the titular Dini's mother Shinta.

Kandou made her return to feature films in 2004, when she acted in d'Trex and Ketika. In 2011 she acted in the comedy Kejarlah Jodoh Kau Kutangkap, the title of which referenced her earlier work.

Kandou filed for divorce from Mirdad in April 2013. The two have four children together: Nana Mirdad, Kenang Kana, Nasyila Mirdad, and Nathana Ghaza.

Filmography
 Kandou has acted in 55 films.

Anak-anak Buangan (1979)
Mencari Cinta (1979)
Pelajaran Cinta (1979)
Kisah Cinta Rojali dan Zuleha (1979)
Remaja Idaman (1979)
Remaja-remaja (1979)
Wanita Segala Zaman (1979)
Hallo Sayang (1980)
Seindah Rembulan (1980)
Nikmatnya Cinta (1980)
Kau Tercipta Untukku (1980)
Darna Ajaib (1980)
Lima Cewek Jagoan (1980)
Sekuntum Duri (1980)
Hilangnya Sebuah Mahkota (1980)
Bunga-bunga SMA (1980)
Tempatmu di Sisiku (1980)
Kembang Padang Kelabu (1980)
Jangan Sakiti Hatinya (1980)
Manis-manis Sombong (1980)
Nostalgia di SMA (1980)
Aladin dan Lampu Wasiat (1980)
Melodi Cinta (1980)
Masih Adakah Cinta (1980)
Roman Picisan (1980)
Dalam Lingkaran Cinta (1981)
Srigala (1981)
Perawan-perawan (1981)
Bunga-bunga Perkawinan (1981)

Perawan Rimba (1982)
Johanna (1983)
Tujuh Wanita Dalam Tugas Rahasia (1983)
Maju Kena Mundur Kena (1983)
Pokoknya Beres (1983)
Tahu Diri Dong (1984)
Untukmu Kuserahkan Segalanya (1984)
Kejarlah Daku Kau Kutangkap (1985)
Kesempatan dalam Kesempitan (1985)
Gadis Hitam Putih (1985)
Keluarga Markum (1986)
Memburu Makelar Mayat (1986)
Pengantin Baru (1986)
Tirai Perkawinan (1987)
Bendi Keramat (1988)
Siapa Menabur Benci Akan Menuai Bencana (1988)
Cas Cis Cus (Sonata di Tengah Kota) (1989)
Jangan Bilang Siapa-siapa (1990)
Antri Dong (1990)
Gonta Ganti (1990)
Kepingin Sih Kepingin (1990)
Boneka dari Indiana (1990)
Ramadhan dan Ramona (1992)
d'Trex (2004)
Ketika (2004)
Kejarlah Jodoh Kau Kutangkap (2011)
''Benyamin Biang Kerok'(2018)

Awards and nominations

References

Works cited

External links

1963 births
Indo people
Living people
Indonesian Christians
Citra Award winners
Indonesian female models
Indonesian actresses
Indonesian Protestants
Indonesian people of Dutch descent
Indonesian people of Filipino descent
Indonesian people of Indian descent
People of Sangirese descent
Minahasa people
People from Jakarta